Cavatina is a musical term, originally meaning a short song of simple character, without a second strain or any repetition of the air. It is now frequently applied to any simple, melodious air, as distinguished from brilliant arias or recitatives, many of which are part of a larger movement or scena in oratorio or opera.

One famous piece that bears the name, although without words, is the 5th movement of Beethoven's String Quartet in B-flat major, Opus 130. "Ecco, ridente in cielo" from Gioachino Rossini's opera The Barber of Seville,  "Porgi amor" and "Se vuol ballare" from Mozart's The Marriage of Figaro are also well-known cavatinas. Ralph Vaughan Williams gave the title of "Cavatina" to the 3rd movement of his Symphony no. 8.

In opera, the term has been described as:
<blockquote>a musical form appearing in operas and occasionally in cantatas and instrumental music....In opera the cavatina is an aria, generally of brilliant character, sung in one or two sections without repeats. It developed in the mid-18th century, coincident with the decline of the previously favoured da capo aria (in which the musical form is ABA, with the repeated A section given improvised variations). Examples occur in the operas of Mozart, Weber, and Rossini. In 19th-century bel canto operas of Bellini, Donizetti, and Verdi the term came to refer to a principal singer’s opening aria, whether in one movement or paired with a contrasting cabaletta.<ref name=Britannica>[http://www.britannica.com/EBchecked/topic/100582/cavatina  Encyclopædia Britannica online] at britannica.com</ref></blockquote>

Derivation
In Italian, the word is the diminutive of cavata, the producing of tone from a musical instrument. The Italian plural is cavatine. In French it is the cavatine and in German Kavatine''.

References

Italian opera terminology